Shalom Cohen may refer to:

Shalom ben Jacob Cohen, Hebrew scholar
Shalom Cohen (diplomat) (born 1955), Israeli ambassador to Egypt
Shalom Cohen (politician) (1926−1993), Israeli politician; member of the Knesset
Shalom Cohen (rabbi) (1931−2022), Israeli rabbi